Ted's Diner was a historic diner at 67 Main Street in Milford, Massachusetts.

History
Ted's Diner was manufactured by the Tierney Diner company in the 1920s and was, until its demise, the oldest of its make in the country.  It was also unusual in the state as a double-width diner, and was grafted onto an adjacent late 19th-century house, which provided additional seating capacity.

Ted's was removed to make way for the expansion of Milford's firehouse. After sitting in a parking lot for almost a year, vandals and weather had taken their toll, and Ted's was finally demolished.

The diner was added to the National Register of Historic Places in 2000.

See also
National Register of Historic Places listings in Worcester County, Massachusetts

References

Buildings and structures in Worcester County, Massachusetts
Demolished buildings and structures in Massachusetts
Diners on the National Register of Historic Places
Diners in Massachusetts
Milford, Massachusetts
National Register of Historic Places in Worcester County, Massachusetts
Restaurants in Massachusetts
Restaurants on the National Register of Historic Places in Massachusetts
Buildings and structures demolished in 2002